Ottó Hátszeghy (26 May 1902 – 21 July 1977) was a Hungarian épée and foil fencer. He competed at the 1928 and 1936 Summer Olympics.

References

External links
 

1902 births
1977 deaths
Hungarian male foil fencers
Olympic fencers of Hungary
Fencers at the 1928 Summer Olympics
Fencers at the 1936 Summer Olympics
People from Bijeljina
Hungarian male épée fencers